The 2014 Queensland Cup season was the 19th season of Queensland's premier rugby league competition.

Regular season
All times are in AEST (UTC+10:00) on the relevant dates.

Round 1

Source: Intrust Super Cup 2014 Round 1 – QRL Website

Round 2

Source: Intrust Super Cup 2014 Round 2 – QRL Website

Round 3

Source: Intrust Super Cup 2014 Round 3 – QRL Website

Round 4

Source: Intrust Super Cup 2014 Round 4 – QRL Website

Round 5

Source: Intrust Super Cup 2014 Round 5 – QRL Website

Round 6

Source: Intrust Super Cup 2014 Round 6 – QRL Website

Round 7

 The match between the Northern Pride and Easts Tigers was postponed due to tropical cyclone Ita
Source: Intrust Super Cup 2014 Round 7 – QRL Website

Round 8

Source: Intrust Super Cup 2014 Round 8 – QRL Website

Round 9

Source:Intrust Super Cup 2014 Round 9 – QRL Website

Round 10 - Rivalry Round

Source: Intrust Super Cup 2014 Round 10 – QRL Website

Round 11

Source: Intrust Super Cup 2014 Round 11 – QRL Website

Round 12

Source: Intrust Super Cup 2014 Round 12 – QRL Website

Round 13

Source: Intrust Super Cup 2014 Round 13 – QRL Website

Round 14

Source: Intrust Super Cup 2014 Round 14 – QRL Website

Round 15

Source: Intrust Super Cup 2014 Round 15 – QRL Website

Round 16

Source: Intrust Super Cup 2014 Round 16 – QRL Website

Round 17

Source: Intrust Super Cup 2014 Round 17 – QRL Website

Round 18

Source: Intrust Super Cup 2014 Round 18 – QRL Website

Round 19

Source: Intrust Super Cup 2014 Round 19 – QRL Website

Round 20

Source: Intrust Super Cup 2014 Round 20 – QRL Website

Round 21

Source: Intrust Super Cup 2014 Round 21 – QRL Website

Round 22

Source: Intrust Super Cup 2014 Round 22 – QRL Website

Round 23 - Country Week

Source: Intrust Super Cup 2014 Round 23 – QRL Website

Round 24

Source: Intrust Super Cup 2014 Round 24 – QRL Website

Round 25

Source: Intrust Super Cup 2014 Round 25 – QRL Website

Round 26

Source: Intrust Super Cup 2014 Round 26 – QRL Website

References

2014 in Australian rugby league
Queensland Cup